Iuliana Munteanu (born 14 November 1955) is a Romanian rower. She competed in the women's eight event at the 1976 Summer Olympics.

References

1955 births
Living people
Romanian female rowers
Olympic rowers of Romania
Rowers at the 1976 Summer Olympics
People from Ilfov County